This is a list of winners and nominees for the BAFTA Award for Best Special Visual Effects for each year. This award is for special effects and visual effects and recognises achievement in both of these crafts. The British Academy of Film and Television Arts (BAFTA) is a British organisation that hosts annual awards shows for movies, television, children's movies and television, and interactive media.

Winners and nominees

1980s

1990s

2000s

2010s

2020s

See also
 Academy Award for Best Visual Effects
 Critics' Choice Movie Award for Best Visual Effects

References

External links
 

British Academy Film Awards
 
Film awards for Best Visual Effects